Beryllium hydroxide, Be(OH)2, is an amphoteric hydroxide, dissolving in both acids and alkalis. Industrially, it is produced as a by-product in the extraction of beryllium metal from the ores beryl and bertrandite. The natural pure beryllium hydroxide is rare (in form of the mineral behoite, orthorhombic) or very rare (clinobehoite, monoclinic). When alkali is added to beryllium salt solutions the α-form (a gel) is formed. If this left to stand or boiled, the rhombic β-form precipitates. This has the same structure as zinc hydroxide, Zn(OH)2, with tetrahedral beryllium centers.

Reactions
Beryllium hydroxide is difficult to dissolve in water. With alkalis it dissolves to form the tetrahydroxoberyllate (also known as tetrahydroxidoberyllate) anion, [Be(OH)4]2−. With sodium hydroxide solution:
2 NaOH(aq) + Be(OH)2(s) → Na2[Be(OH)4](aq)

With acids, beryllium salts are formed. For example, with sulfuric acid, H2SO4, beryllium sulfate is formed:
Be(OH)2 + H2SO4 → BeSO4 + 2 H2O

Beryllium hydroxide dehydrates at 400 °C to form the soluble white powder, beryllium oxide:
Be(OH)2 → BeO + H2O
Further heating at higher temperature produces acid insoluble BeO.

References

Amphoteric compounds
Beryllium compounds
Hydroxides